The 2009–10 Kansas State Wildcats women's basketball team represented the Kansas State University in the 2009–10 NCAA Division I basketball season. The Wildcats are coached by Deb Patterson. The Wildcats are a member of the Big 12 Conference.

Offseason
April 9: Kansas State guard Shalee Lehning was selected with the 25th overall selection in the second round of the 2009 WNBA Draft by the Atlanta Dream. Lehning became the sixth player in school history to be selected during the WNBA Draft and the eighth player overall to become a part of the league.
May 13: Former Kansas State forward Marlies Gipson signed a training camp contract with the Atlanta Dream. Gipson joined former K-State teammate Shalee Lehning on the Dream's training camp roster.
May 13: Former Kansas State guard Shalee Lehning's jersey put on permanent display at the Women's Basketball Hall of Fame in Knoxville, Tennessee. The uniform, her purple road jersey, will be on display in the Hall's “Ring of Honor”, recognizing Lehning's achievements during the 2008–09 season.
August 21: The 2009-10 preseason candidates list for the Women's Wooden Award was released, naming 31 student athletes. Ashley Sweat from Kansas State was one of the candidates.

Schedule

|-
!colspan=9| Exhibition

|-
!colspan=9| Regular Season

|-
!colspan=9| Big 12 Season

|-
!colspan=9| Phillips 66 Big 12 Championship

See also
2009–10 Kansas State Wildcats men's basketball team

References

External links
Official Site

Kansas State Wildcats women's basketball seasons
Kansas State